Shunfeng may refer to:

 Shunfeng, Linwu (舜峰镇, Shùnfēng Zhèn), a town in Linwu County, Hunan
  (顺峰乡, Shùnfēng Xiāng) in Wan'an County, Ji'an, Jiangxi
 Shunfeng station (顺风, Shùnfēng) in Chengdu, Sichuan
 SF Express (顺丰速运, Shùnfēng Sùyùn), a delivery and logistics company headquartered in Shenzhen, Guangdong
 SF Airlines (顺丰航空公司, Shùnfēng Hángkōng Gōngsī), a cargo airline owned by SF Express